Jonathan Roger Sorensen (born October 10, 1965) is an American sociologist, criminologist, and professor in the Department of Criminal Justice at the East Carolina University College of Human Ecology. He is known for his research on capital punishment in the United States
and how it can be influenced by extralegal factors such as victim race.

References

External links
Faculty page

1965 births
Living people
East Carolina University faculty
Sam Houston State University alumni
Prairie View A&M University people
American criminologists